Arthur Underwood (21 September 1927 – 29 June 2016) was an English cricketer. He played sixteen first-class matches for Nottinghamshire between 1949 and 1954.

See also
 List of Nottinghamshire County Cricket Club players

References

External links
 

1927 births
2016 deaths
Combined Services cricketers
Cricketers from Nottinghamshire
English cricketers
Nottinghamshire cricketers
People from Wiseton